Woman doctor or woman doctors may refer to:
Women in medicine
A doctor specialising in women's health

Media
Woman Doctor, a 1939 American film
Woman Doctor, a 1976 book by Florence Pat Haseltine
Woman Doctors, a 1984 German film
, a 1999 Japanese television series starring Miki Nakatani